Ramón Darío Larrosa De los Santos (born 13 December 1971 in Montevideo) is a Uruguayan footballer who played for Racing Club de Montevideo.

References

1971 births
Living people
Footballers from Montevideo
Uruguayan footballers
Racing Club de Montevideo players
C.S.D. Municipal players
C.D. Águila footballers
C.A. Progreso players
Expatriate footballers in El Salvador
Expatriate footballers in Guatemala
Association football midfielders